Mucoromycota is a division within the kingdom fungi. It includes a diverse group of various molds, including the common bread molds Mucor and Rhizopus. It is a sister phylum to Dikarya.

Informally known as zygomycetes I, Mucoromycota includes Mucoromycotina, Mortierellomycotina, and Glomeromycotina, and consists of mainly mycorrhizal fungi, root endophytes, and plant decomposers. Mucoromycotina and Glomeromycotina can form mycorrhiza-like relationships with nonvascular plants. Mucoromycota contain multiple mycorrhizal lineages, root endophytes, and decomposers of plant-based carbon sources. Mucoromycotina species known as mycoparasites, or putative parasites of arthropods are like saprobes. When Mucoromycota infect animals, they are seen as opportunistic pathogens. Mucoromycotina are fast-growing fungi and early colonizers of carbon-rich substrates. Mortierellomycotina are common soil fungi that occur as root endophytes of woody plants and are isolated as saprobes. Glomeromycotina live in soil, forming a network of hyphae, but depend on organic carbon from host plants. In exchange, the arbuscular mycorrhizal fungi provide nutrients to the plant.

Reproduction 
Known reproduction states of Mucoromycota are zygospore production and asexual reproduction. Zygospores can have decorations on their surface and range up to several millimeters in diameter. Asexual reproduction typically involves the production of sporangiospores or chlamydospores. Multicellular sporcaps are present within  Mucoromycotina, Mortierellomycotina and as aggregations of spore-producing in species of Glomeromycotina. Shown in Mucorales, sexual reproduction is under the control of mating type genes, sexP and sexM, which regulate the production of pheromones required for the maturation of hyphae into gametangia. The sexP gene is expressed during vegetative growth and matting, while the sexM gene is expressed during mating. Glomeromycotina sexual reproduction is unknown. However, asexual chlamydospore spores can be created terminally, laterally, or intercalary on specialized hyphae. Species of Glomeromycotina produce coenocytic hyphae that can have bacterial endosymbionts. Mortierellomycotina reproduce asexually by sporangia that either lack or have a reduced columella, which support the sporangium. Species of Mortierellomycotina only form microscopic colonies, but some make multicellular sporocarps. Mucoromycotina sexual reproduction is by prototypical zygospore formation and asexual reproduction and involves the large production of sporangia.

Morphology 
Mucoromycotina contain discoidal hemispherical spindle pole bodies. Although spindle pole bodies function as microtubule organizing centers, they lack remnants of the centrioles’ characteristic 9+2 microtubule arrangement. Species of Mucoromycotina and Mortierellomycotina produce large-diameter, coenocytic hyphae. Glomeromycotina also form coenocytic hyphae with highly branched, narrow hyphal arbuscules in host cells. When septations occur in Mucoromycota they are formed at the base of reproductive structures.

Production of lipids, polyphosphates, and carotenoids 
Mucoromycota's metabolism can utilize many substrates that are from various nitrogen and phosphorus resources to produce lipids, chitin, polyphosphates, and carotenoids. They have been found to co-produce metabolites in a single fermentation process like polyphosphates and lipids. The overproduction of chitin from Mucoromycota fungi can be accomplished by limiting inorganic phosphorus. Mucoromycota are capable of accumulating high amounts of lipids in their cell biomass, which allows the fungi to produce polyunsaturated fatty acids and carotenoids. They have been found to induce antimicrobial activity from fungal crude total lipids. The high production of lipids from Mucoromycota have the potential for use in biodiesel production.

Gallery

See also 
Mucor circinelloides

References

External links 

 

Zygomycota
Fungus phyla
Fungi by classification